The 1975–76 season was Nottingham Forest's 111th year in existence and fourth campaign consecutive in the Second Division since their relegation in 1972.

Summary

During summer the Board appointed BJ Appleby as its new club chairman. The team was reinforced with several players, Goalkeeper Peter Wells from the youth team. For the defensive line, Frank Clark arrived free from Newcastle United after 14 seasons. For the midfield, Terry Curran was transferred in from Doncaster Rovers included the transfers out of Peacock and Ian Miller. In spite of the arrivals, the squad started poorly in League, and was early eliminated in League Cup. For winter, defender Colin Barrett was transferred in from Manchester City playing only a few matches in the season because an injury. The club was early eliminated in FA Cup being defeated by Peterborough United. For the second half of the season, Clough reinforced the defensive line with McGovern acting as a central-back defender, combined with a boosted performance of Bowyer and Curran allowed the squad to finish on a decent 8th spot in League.

Squad

Transfers

Statistics

Players statistics

The statistics for the following players are for their time during 1975–76 season playing for Nottingham Forest. Any stats from a different club during 1974–75 are not included. Includes all competitive matches.

Table

Results by round

Matches

A list of Nottingham Forest's matches in the 1975–76 season.

Competitive

Second Division

League Cup

First round

Second round

Third round

FA Cup

Third round

Replay

References

Nottingham Forest F.C. seasons
Nottingham Forest